Mariana Pineda (born 3 January 2001) is an Argentinian field hockey player.

Hockey career 
In 2021, Pineda was called into the senior national women's team.

References

External links

Argentine female field hockey players
Living people
2001 births
Field hockey players from Buenos Aires
21st-century Argentine women